William W-G. Yeh is a Taiwanese-American civil engineer and the Richard G. Newman AECOM Distinguished Professor of Civil Engineering, University of California, Los Angeles, a Chair position that he was given in 2010. His research work has involved the development of computer models for optimal operations of large-scale hydropower and water supply systems. He is an Elected Fellow of the American Geophysical Union, Elected Fellow and Elected Honorary Member of the American Society of Civil Engineers (ASCE), Elected Member of the National Academy of Engineering and also Elected Fellow of the American Association for the Advancement of Science. He was also given the Julian Hinds Award, for his outstanding work, and also the Lifetime Achievement Award, both by the ASCE. In 2008, a symposium at UCLA honored Yeh's work. He was the Editor of the ASCE's Journal of Water Resources Planning and Management from 1988 to 1993. He has authored 10 books and then also authored and co-authored 141 published papers in journals. In total, his original research has been cited more than 10,000 times.

Education
He received his Bachelor of Science degree from National Cheng Kung University in 1961, his Master of Science from New Mexico State University in 1964 and his Ph.D from Stanford University in 1967.

Personal
Professor Yeh immigrated from Taiwan to the United States in 1961.  He lives in Los Angeles with his wife Jennie Yeh, and has two sons Michael Yeh, M.D., Chief of the Division of Endocrine Surgery at UCLA, and Robert Yeh, M.D., Director of the Richard and Susan Smith Center for Outcomes Research in Cardiology at Beth Israel Deaconess Medical Center.

References

External links

Year of birth missing (living people)
Living people
 UCLA Henry Samueli School of Engineering and Applied Science faculty
National Cheng Kung University alumni
New Mexico State University alumni
Stanford University alumni
Taiwanese civil engineers
Taiwanese emigrants to the United States
Members of the United States National Academy of Engineering
Fellows of the American Association for the Advancement of Science
Fellows of the American Geophysical Union
Fellows of the American Society of Civil Engineers
American people of Chinese descent